This Hero Stuff is a 1919 American silent Western comedy film directed by Henry King and starring William Russell, Winifred Westover, and J. Barney Sherry.

Cast
 William Russell as Captain November Jones 
 Winifred Westover as Nedra Joseph 
 J. Barney Sherry as Jackson J. Joseph 
 Charles K. French as Samuel Barnes 
 Mary Thurman as Teddy Craig 
 Harvey Clark as Jonathan Pillsbury 
 J. Farrell MacDonald as Softnose Smith

References

Bibliography
 Donald W. McCaffrey & Christopher P. Jacobs. Guide to the Silent Years of American Cinema. Greenwood Publishing, 1999.

External links

 
 

1919 films
1910s Western (genre) comedy films
Films directed by Henry King
1910s English-language films
Pathé Exchange films
American black-and-white films
1919 comedy films
Silent American Western (genre) comedy films
1910s American films